DESOTO patrols (DeHaven Special Operations off TsingtaO)
were patrols conducted by U.S. Navy destroyers equipped with a mobile "van" of signals-intelligence equipment used for intelligence collection in hostile waters.
The  became the namesake for these patrols. De Haven performed the first patrol off the coast of China in April 1962. The  carried out the first patrol to target North Vietnam in the Gulf of Tonkin in December 1962.

These patrols were initially a response to the Chinese Communists' unexpected re-definition of their territorial waters to include all waters shoreward from lines drawn tangentially to, and between, twelve-mile circles drawn around their offshore islands. Such a declaration represented a huge expansion of their claims. This inhibited the lawful navigation of international waters as defined by US interests and increased the likelihood and frequency of formal diplomatic "serious warnings" issued by Beijing when any Seventh Fleet units navigated through these areas. This became a situation to which Commander Seventh Fleet felt compelled to respond.

These types of patrols had previously been conducted off the coasts of the Soviet Union, China, and North Korea, but are widely recognized for their role in the Vietnam War. There were three components to the purpose of these patrols. First, they would establish and maintain the presence of the
U.S. Seventh Fleet in the international waters off the China coast and later the Vietnamese coast. Second, they would serve as a minor Cold War irritant to the Chinese Communists. Third, they would collect as much intelligence
as possible during the patrols.

Tactically, the patrols off Vietnam aimed to intercept North Vietnamese Army intelligence and to relay it to South Vietnamese Army forces. With the intercepted communications, the South Vietnamese were able to more effectively coordinate their raids. The aircraft carrier  provided destroyers taking part in the DESOTO patrols off Vietnam with air support.

The DESOTO patrols off Vietnam from 1963 onwards formed part of a larger scheme known as Operation 34A. Run by the Department of Defense at the time, Operation 34A, or "OPLAN 34Alpha" was a top-secret program consisting primarily of covert actions against the North Vietnamese.

Patrols and SIGADs
The naval Direct Support Units (DSUs) based out of the U.S. Naval Communication Station, Philippines, in San Miguel, Philippines (SIGAD USN-27) used the SIGAD USN-467 as a generic designator for their missions. Each specific patrol received a letter suffix for its duration. The subsequent mission would receive the next letter in an alphabetic sequence.

Declassified SIGADs
The following table lists the patrols that have been declassified.

Gulf of Tonkin Incident

SIGAD USN-467N specifically designates the DSU aboard  during the patrol involved with the Gulf of Tonkin incident. This patrol was 18th DESOTO type patrol (each with a Naval Security Group detachment embarked) conducted since 1962. On August 2, 1964, the destroyer Maddox, engaged three North Vietnamese Navy torpedo boats of the 135th Torpedo Squadron. A sea battle resulted, in which Maddox expended over two hundred and eighty  and  shells, and in which four USN F-8 Crusader jet fighter bombers strafed the torpedo boats. One US aircraft was damaged, one  round hit the destroyer, three North Vietnamese torpedo boats were damaged, and four North Vietnamese sailors were killed and six were wounded; there were no U.S. casualties.

Post Gulf of Tonkin Engagement

Even after the Gulf of Tonkin incident, the DESOTO patrols continued. On 11 September 1964 the Director of the Naval Security Group, Pacific (DIRNAVSECGRUPAC) informed the Director of the NSA (DIRNSA) of plans for an intercept team, SIGAD USN-467P, to be aboard . The patrol was conducted by USS Morton and  approximately one month after the Gulf of Tonkin incident. During this patrol Morton fired upon five fast closing targets, but was unable to confirm the targets visually. Based on radar surveillance the patrol claimed hits on three of the targets.

See also
 Gulf of Tonkin Incident
 National Security Agency
 Naval Security Group
 Signals Intelligence
 USS Liberty Incident
 USS Pueblo Incident

References

Works cited
 

Destroyers of the United States Navy